NK Jadran may refer to:

NK Jadran Dekani, football club from Dekani, Slovenia
NK Jadran Hrpelje-Kozina, football club from Hrpelje-Kozina, Slovenia
NK Jadran Poreč, football club from Poreč, Croatia
NK Jadran Kaštel Sućurac, football club from Kaštel Sućurac, Croatia
NK Jadran Luka Ploče, football club from Ploče, Croatia